Crotonothrips is a genus of thrips in the family Phlaeothripidae.

Species
 Crotonothrips cacharensis
 Crotonothrips coorgensis
 Crotonothrips dantahasta
 Crotonothrips davidi
 Crotonothrips dentifer
 Crotonothrips dissimilis
 Crotonothrips erraticus
 Crotonothrips gallarum
 Crotonothrips longirostris
 Crotonothrips maoensis
 Crotonothrips memecylonicus
 Crotonothrips mimicus
 Crotonothrips nagaensis
 Crotonothrips nelliampathiensis
 Crotonothrips parvus
 Crotonothrips polyalthiae

References

Phlaeothripidae
Thrips
Thrips genera